Zerodur (notation of the manufacturer: ZERODUR®), a registered trademark of Schott AG, is a lithium-aluminosilicate glass-ceramic produced by Schott AG since 1968. It has been used for a number of very large telescope mirrors including GTC, Keck I, Keck II, and SOFIA, as well as some smaller telescopes (such as the GREGOR Solar Telescope). With its very low coefficient of thermal expansion (CTE) it can be used to produce mirrors that retain acceptable figures in extremely cold environments such as deep space. Although it has advantages for applications requiring a coefficient of thermal expansion less than that of borosilicate glass, it remains very expensive as compared to borosilicate. The tight tolerance on CTE, ±0.007 K−1, allows for its use in high-precision applications.

Applications

 Optics
 Microlithography
 Measurement technology

Properties
Zerodur has both an amorphous (vitreous) component and a crystalline component. Its most important properties are:
 Particularly low thermal expansion: in the range 0 to 50 °C it has a mean of 0 ± 0.007 K−1, which is two orders of magnitude better than that of fused quartz.
 High 3D homogeneity with few inclusions, bubbles and internal stria (as contrasted to Cer-Vit).
 Hardness similar to that of borosilicate glass, so that it can be ground and polished more easily than fused quartz.
 High affinity for coatings.
 Low helium permeability.
 Non-porous (as contrasted to sintered ceramics).
 Good chemical stability similar to that of fused quartz.
 Fracture toughness approximately 0.9 MPa·m1/2.

Physical properties
 Dispersion: (nF − nC) = 0.00967
 Density: 2.53 g/cm3 at 25 °C
 Young's modulus: 9.1 Pa
 Poisson ratio: 0.24
 Specific heat capacity at 25 °C: 0.196 cal/(g·K) = 0.82 J/(g·K)
 Coefficient of thermal expansion (20 °C to 300 °C) : 0.05 ± 0.10/K
 Thermal conductivity: at 20 °C: 1.46 W/(m·K)
 Maximum application temperature: 600 °C
 Impact resistance behavior is substantially similar to other glass

See also
 CorningWare
 Macor
 Ring laser gyroscope
 Sitall

References

External links

Glass types
Low-expansion glass
Low thermal expansion materials
Glass-ceramics
Glass trademarks and brands
Transparent materials
German brands